Ingrid Peters (born 19 April 1954 in Dudweiler, Saar Protectorate) is a German singer.

She represented Germany in the Eurovision Song Contest 1986 held in Bergen. Her song, "Über die Brücke geh'n", placed eight. Peters had made previous attempts to represent Germany. In 1979, she performed a song called "Du bist nicht frei" and in 1983 was runner-up in the national contest with "Viva la mamma". Peters was a special guest on the German national contest in 1987 and 2007.

References

External links 

1954 births
Eurovision Song Contest entrants of 1986
Living people
Eurovision Song Contest entrants for Germany
German women singers
Recipients of the Saarland Order of Merit